The Branson Scenic Railway is a heritage railroad in Branson, Missouri.  The Ozark Zephyr, Branson Scenic Railway's historic zephyr train, departs from an old depot in downtown Branson and operates in the scenic Ozark Mountains for an approximate  round trip.

As the underlying rail lines are owned by the Missouri and Northern Arkansas Railroad (MNA) and are still in use as an active railroad, MNA traffic determines whether a particular trip will operate northbound from Branson to Galena, Missouri, or southbound from Branson to the Barren Fork Trestle in Arkansas.

Equipment
The railroad operates a variety of vintage railroad equipment, including two dome cars, a dining car, and several coaches built by the Budd Company.

Motive Power:
On the Northbound end, an EMD F9PHA, built in January 1951 for the Baltimore & Ohio Railroad as an EMD F7, numbered 369 in order #6161 with a serial number of 12668 and frame number 6161-A23. The locomotive was rebuilt in 1981 and served in Maryland with MDOT then MARC before becoming the Branson Scenic 98.
On the Southbound end of the train is an EMD GP30.  This locomotive was built in January 1963 for the Baltimore & Ohio Railroad as their number 6973 in order 7631 with a serial number of 27690 and frame number 7631-46. This locomotive went to Chessie System with the same number then to CSX being renumbered to 4265, before becoming the Branson Scenic 4265 before being renumbered to 99 some time after. This arrangement makes it possible to make the return trip without having to use a wye junction or a passing siding.

Passenger Cars:
"Silver Garden"
Built by the Budd Company on job 9657-112 ordered by the Chicago Burlington & Quincy Railroad in March 1951 and delivered in December 1952. It was built as Dome, Buffet, Lounge number 320 for the Kansas City Zephyr. In addition to the 24 dome seats, there was a coffee shop that seated 17 passengers in front of the dome and, under the dome was a 6 seat lounge with buffet. A 24 seat coach section was behind the dome with a conductor's seat. With the Burlington northern merger the car was to be assigned BN 1100 but, was sold to Amtrak and became their 9800. It was retired in 1977 and, sold to Gerome Bulock of Building Leasing Corporation and, then in 1987 was sold to Tom Johnson of Rail Dome Corporation becoming the RDCX 320 (AMTK 800287) and now operates on the Branson Scenic Railway.

"Silver Terrace":
Built by the Budd Company in 1952 for the Chicago Burlington & Quincy Railroad as their number 365 for the Kansas City Zephyr. It is a blunt end Observation Dome Parlor car. After the 1970 merger into the Burlington Northern it was to be numbered BN 1192, it became Amtrak 9320. After retirement from Amtrak it was sold and, eventually came to the Branson Scenic as their #9320. When GP30 #99 is out of service, this car will be converted to a temporary Control car by adding Ditch lights to the blunt end of the car.

"Westport"
Build for the Atlantic Coast Line Railroad as their 251, a blunt end Observation Tavern car, the Westport became the Seaboard Coast Line Railroad 5830 and, then Amtrak 3330 before being purchased by the Heritage Rail Corporation.

"Silver Lake"
This car was built for the Pennsylvania Railroad as a parlor car and, after purchase by Amtrak was remodeled into a lounge. After being retired from Amtrak it found its way to the Branson Scenic.

"Silver Chef"
This car was built for the Chicago Burlington & Quincy as a diner by the Budd Company on Job 9624-169, ordered in February 1955, delivered in October 1956. The Budd Job was for two diners for the CB&Q's Denver Zephyr, number 201, named the SILVER CHEF, and number 202, named the SILVER TUREEN. The 201 was to become the BN 1165 after the merger. It was sold to Amtrak becoming their 8054. After conversion to HEP it was renumbered 8503. It was retired and came to the Branson Scenic as their 8503.

"Silver Island"
This car was also built by the Budd Company for the CB&Q.
"Silver Belle"
Silver Belle is a dining car built in 1949 for the Southern Railway. It was acquired by Amtrak later on, then sold to Branson Scenic in January 2019 during an auction.

History
The railroad was originally built as the White River Railway between 1902 and 1905.  Because of the rugged terrain of the Ozarks, a number of trestles and tunnels were required in order to create a level railroad grade.  The lines later became part of the Missouri Pacific Railroad, and in 1992 were sold to 
MNA.

References

 Branson Scenic Railway

Transportation in Boone County, Arkansas
Heritage railroads in Missouri
Tourist attractions in Stone County, Missouri
Tourist attractions in Taney County, Missouri
Tourist attractions in Boone County, Arkansas
Heritage railroads in Arkansas